Phra Ruang is a Thai legendary figure. The name may also refer to:

 , a Siamese naval ship
 Phra Ruang Dynasty, the ruling family of the Sukhothai Kingdom
 Phra Ruang dam or Saritphong Dam, a historic dam in Sukhothai